Luiz Henrique da Silva Alves or simply Luiz Henrique (born 2 July 1981 in Rio de Janeiro), is a Brazilian striker. He currently plays for Bangu.

On 23 November 2008, Luiz scored the decisive winner in a K-League play-off match against Seongnam Ilhwa Chunma, helping Jeonbuk Hyundai Motors advance to the next stage of the play-off.

In 2009 K-League, He led Jeonbuk Hyundai Motors to 2009 K-League Champion and placed top assister at 2009 season.

On 23 December 2009, Jeonbuk completed to convert his loan move into a permanent deal. On 19 July 2016 he moved to Gangwon FC in K League Challenge.

External links
 CBF 
 sambafoot 
 Guardian Stats Centre 
 palmeiras.globo.com 
 

1981 births
Living people
Brazilian footballers
CR Vasco da Gama players
Nacional Futebol Clube players
Associação Desportiva São Caetano players
Sociedade Esportiva Palmeiras players
Brazilian expatriate footballers
Campeonato Brasileiro Série A players
Suwon Samsung Bluewings players
Jeonbuk Hyundai Motors players
Gangwon FC players
Al Shabab Al Arabi Club Dubai players
Emirates Club players
Ajman Club players
Expatriate footballers in South Korea
Expatriate footballers in the United Arab Emirates
K League 1 players
Brazilian expatriate sportspeople in South Korea
Brazilian expatriate sportspeople in the United Arab Emirates
Association football forwards
UAE First Division League players
UAE Pro League players
Footballers from Rio de Janeiro (city)